Vall de Almonacid is a municipality in the comarca of Alto Palancia, Castellón, Valencia, Spain. The name in Valencian is La Vall d'Almonesir, but the local language is Spanish, not Valencian.

It contains the "Castle of Almonesir".

See also
Serra d'Espadà

References 

Municipalities in the Province of Castellón
Alto Palancia